Eyvind Brynildsen (born 14 January 1988) is a Norwegian rally driver. During 2011 he competed in the Super 2000 World Rally Championship in a Škoda Fabia S2000. He is currently looking for a drive with the Adapta World Rally Team alongside Mads Østberg, where he drove the second Ford Fiesta RS WRC during the 2012 Rally Sweden.

Career results

WRC results

PWRC results

SWRC results

WRC-2 results

ERC results

External links 

 
 Profile at ewrc-results.com

1988 births
Living people
World Rally Championship drivers
Norwegian rally drivers
European Rally Championship drivers
Toksport WRT drivers
M-Sport drivers